The Ministry of Finance is a ministry of the Government of Ontario responsible for managing the province's fiscal policy, developing the provincial budget, and financial sector regulation. The minister of finance – called the treasurer before 1993 – leads the ministry and is responsible to the Legislative Assembly of Ontario.

History
For most of the period from 1867 until 1993, the minister was called the treasurer or provincial treasurer.

The ministry were renamed the Ministry of Economics  in 1956 and the minister became known as Minister in charge of Economics instead of treasurer. From January to December 1961, the ministry became the Ministry of Economics and Federal and Provincial Relations. The title of treasurer was revived in December 1961 with the minister also often holding the secondary title of minister of economics or some variation after 1968. Frank Miller had the sole title of minister of economics from 1978 until 1981 when he was given the additional title of treasurer. At various times in the 1960s and 1970s the minister also held the titles of chairman of the management board of cabinet, chairman of the treasury board and/or minister of revenue. This practice was revived in recent years with Greg Sorbara acting as finance minister and chair of both the management board and the treasury board. It has ended as there is now a different person holding the position of chair of the management and treasury board.

In 1993, the positions of treasurer and minister of economics were formally combined and renamed the minister of finance.

In early 2007, Premier Dalton McGuinty split the province's revenue collection function from the Ministry of Finance and resurrected the Ministry of Revenue, a portfolio that had not been used since the Ontario New Democratic Party government of Bob Rae in 1993. Following the 2011 Ontario general election, the Ministry of Revenue was merged back into the Ministry of Finance.

List of ministers

References

External links
 

1867 establishments in Ontario
Ontario
Ontario, Finance
Finance
Oshawa